Elections to Coleraine Borough Council were held on 15 May 1985 on the same day as the other Northern Irish local government elections. The election used three district electoral areas to elect a total of 21 councillors.

Election results

Note: "Votes" are the first preference votes.

Districts summary

|- class="unsortable" align="centre"
!rowspan=2 align="left"|Ward
! % 
!Cllrs
! % 
!Cllrs
! %
!Cllrs
! %
!Cllrs
! % 
!Cllrs
!rowspan=2|TotalCllrs
|- class="unsortable" align="center"
!colspan=2 bgcolor="" | UUP
!colspan=2 bgcolor="" | DUP
!colspan=2 bgcolor="" | SDLP
!colspan=2 bgcolor="" | Alliance
!colspan=2 bgcolor="white"| Others
|-
|align="left"|Bann
|bgcolor="40BFF5"|51.9
|bgcolor="40BFF5"|4
|21.5
|1
|23.0
|2
|0.0
|0
|3.6
|0
|7
|-
|align="left"|Coleraine Town
|26.9
|2
|bgcolor="#D46A4C"|41.6
|bgcolor="#D46A4C"|3
|4.5
|0
|8.0
|1
|19.0
|1
|7
|-
|align="left"|The Skerries
|bgcolor="40BFF5"|48.2
|bgcolor="40BFF5"|4
|30.2
|2
|9.1
|0
|11.9
|1
|0.6
|0
|7
|-
|- class="unsortable" class="sortbottom" style="background:#C9C9C9"
|align="left"| Total
|42.9
|10
|30.5
|6
|12.9
|2
|6.2
|2
|7.5
|1
|21
|-
|}

District results

Bann

1985: 4 x UUP, 2 x SDLP, 1 x DUP

Coleraine Town

1985: 3 x DUP, 2 x UUP, 1 x Alliance, 1 x Independent

The Skerries

1985: 4 x UUP, 2 x DUP, 1 x Alliance

References

Coleraine Borough Council elections
Coleraine